Lucioni is an Italian surname derived from Latin name Lucius and may refer to:

People
 Danella Lucioni, a Peru-born Italian model 
 Fabio Lucioni, an Italian footballer 
 Luigi Lucioni, an Italian-born American painter.
 José Luccioni, a French operatic tenor of Corsican origin.

See also
 Lucini (disambiguation)
 Luci

Italian-language surnames
Latin-language surnames
Patronymic surnames